

See also
List of Italo disco artists

References

Eurobeat